Othonna cerarioides is a species of the genus Othonna in the family Asteraceae found in Namaqualand, Northern Cape, South Africa.

Description 
This species is described as an erect fleshy shrub 1–2 m tall with rod‐like stems and branches with waxy bark and having large numbers of 20–100mm spur-like shoots. Leaves are obovate-oblanceolate in shape and 5–40 × 3–15 mm. Leaves are clustered at the tips of the spur-shoots, but when flowering, the plant is leafless. Yellow flowers from April to August. The species is unique in the genus for its large size and unusual growth habit.

Taxonomy 
It was described by Magoswana et al. in 2020 as a new species that had previously been called Othonna sp. A. The species epithet refers to the foliage and habit resembling plants in the genus Ceraria.

Distribution and habitat 
The species is commonly found on rocky granite slopes on and around boulders at elevations above 600m around Springbok and O’kiep in northern Namaqualand, Northern Cape, but may also be found in the Richtersveld.

References

External links 

 

Plants described in 2020
cerarioides
Endemic flora of South Africa
Flora of South Africa
Flora of the Cape Provinces